Meropidia nitida is a species of hoverfly in the family Syrphidae.

Distribution
Bolivia.

References

Eristalinae
Insects described in 2013
Diptera of South America